The French  Infantry Division was one of the oldest divisions of the French army.

History

1800 - 1940 
It fought in almost all French campaigns of the 19th and 20th century. 

The First Division was led in 1805 by Pierre Dupont de l'Étang and participated in the Napoleonic Wars, including the Russian campaign and the Battle of Waterloo. 

Between 1859-1862 it was under command of Élie Frédéric Forey and fought in the Second Italian War of Independence.
At the start of the Franco-Prussian War, the Division was led by Auguste-Alexandre Ducrot and suffered a defeat at the Battle of Wissembourg (1870).  

At the beginning of the First World War, it was mobilised in the 1st Military Region and formed part of the 1st Army Corps from August 1914 to November 1918.

In 1935, it was reformed into the 1st Motorised Infantry Division (1st DIM) and fought as such in the Battle of France, after which it was disbanded on 10 June 1940.

It had been rename 1st Light Infantry Division 5 days earlier.

Recreation in 1944-45 
From November 1944, the division was reconstituted in Bourges (France) from former elements of the French forces of the interior (FFI) from the Lille region. 
Its commander was Jean Callies.
The ex-FFI battalions were renamed : 
1st infantry regiment, 
43rd infantry regiment, 
110th infantry regiment, 
15th artillery regiment, 
12th mounted chasseurs regiment. 
The infantry and artillery regiments voluntarily took the same name as the units of the 1st DIM of 1940. The division was initially equipped with ex-German equipment, former French army equipment (such as Hotchkiss H35 tanks and H39 to the 12th Chasseurs) and British equipment, in particular that supplied to the FFI units engaged in the Siege of Dunkirk. It was only partially re-equipped by the Americans, following political friction between de Gaulle and US President Truman. It only reached its theoretical strength of 16,150 men in September 1945.

In April 1945, it was placed at the disposal of the 1st French Army and was engaged at the end of April and the beginning of May in the region of Strasbourg. 
Later it operated on the left bank of the Danube, to clear the rear of the 2nd Moroccan Infantry Division.

In July 1945, the division moved to French-occupied Saarland. It was dissolved in April 1946.

See also 
 1st Free French Division, created in England in August 1940.
 1st Armored Division (France), created in liberated Northern Africa in 1943, and predecessor to today's 1re division Scorpion.

Sources  
 This article is translated from French Wikipedia

Infantry divisions of France
Military units and formations established in 1944
Military units and formations disestablished in 1940
Military units and formations disestablished in 1946